Hans Wedemann (June 25, 1912 – 1989) was a German canoeist, born in Hamburg, who competed in the 1936 Summer Olympics. In 1936, he finished fourth together with his partner Heinrich Sack in the C-2 1000 metre event.

References
Hans Wedemann's profile at Sports Reference.com

1912 births
1989 deaths
Canoeists at the 1936 Summer Olympics
German male canoeists
Olympic canoeists of Germany
Sportspeople from Hamburg